Palaiostani is a village and a municipal community in Pieria, Greece. Since the 2011 local government reform it is part of the municipality Pydna-Kolindros, of which it is a municipal community. The 2011 census recorded 476 residents in the community.

Administrative division
The municipal community of Palaiostani comprises two settlements:
 Palaiostani (population 444)
 Mikri Milia (population 32)
The aforementioned populations are as of 2011.

See also
Pydna-Kolindros
List of settlements in the Pieria regional unit

References

Populated places in Pieria (regional unit)